Aleksandr Aliyev is a Soviet Greco-Roman wrestler, champion and medalist of the USSR championships, medalist of World Wrestling Championships.

Sport results 
 1977 USSR Greco-Roman Wrestling championship — ;
 1978 USSR Greco-Roman Wrestling championship — ;
 1979 USSR Greco-Roman Wrestling championship — ;
 Greco-Roman Wrestling at 1979 Soviet Spartakiad — .

External links 
 

Soviet male sport wrestlers
Living people
1955 births
World Wrestling Championships medalists